Greenwich Island (variant historical names Sartorius Island, Berezina Island) is an island  long and from  (average ) wide, lying between Robert Island and Livingston Island in the South Shetland Islands. Surface area .  The name Greenwich Island dates back to at least 1821 and is now established in international usage.

The Chilean base Arturo Prat and the Ecuadorian base Pedro Vicente Maldonado are situated on the northeast and north coast of the island respectively.

Chilean scientists have claimed that Amerinds visited the area, due to stone artifacts recovered from bottom-sampling operations off the island; however, the artefacts — two arrowheads  — were later found to have been planted.

See also 
 Breznik Heights
 Composite Antarctic Gazetteer
 Dryanovo Heights
 List of Antarctic islands south of 60° S
 SCAR
 Tangra 2004/05 Expedition
 Territorial claims in Antarctica

Maps 
 Chart of South Shetland including Coronation Island, &c. from the exploration of the sloop Dove in the years 1821 and 1822 by George Powell Commander of the same. Scale ca. 1:200000. London: Laurie, 1822.
 L.L. Ivanov et al. Antarctica: Livingston Island and Greenwich Island, South Shetland Islands (from English Strait to Morton Strait, with illustrations and ice-cover distribution). Scale 1:100000 topographic map. Sofia: Antarctic Place-names Commission of Bulgaria, 2005.
 L.L. Ivanov. Antarctica: Livingston Island and Smith Island. Scale 1:100000 topographic map. Manfred Wörner Foundation, 2017.

References

Gallery

External links 

Composite Antarctic Gazetteer
Protected area Chile Bay (Discovery Bay)

 
Bulgaria and the Antarctic